Edward Winship (1901 – 19 October 1929) was an English professional footballer who played in the Football League for Brentford and Coventry City as a full back.

Career
As a youth, Winship played for Northern Alliance club Prudhoe Castle. At age 19, he was signed by Second Division club Crystal Palace, but failed to make a senior appearance. He returned to Prudhoe Castle and moved back to the Second Division to join Coventry City in 1922. After making 84 appearances, he dropped back into non-League football with Birmingham & District League club Kidderminster Harriers in 1925, before returning to the Football League to join Third Division South club Brentford in August 1926, where he played the next three seasons.

Illness and death 
Winship was struck down with yellow jaundice and kidney problems in June 1929, but failed to recover and died five months later in Brentford Hospital. At the time of his death, he and his family lived around the corner from Brentford's Griffin Park ground and the club's directors donated the proceeds from a reserve team match to his widow Sarah and children. A week after his death, Brentford faced Norwich City at Griffin Park and prior to kick off, the 15,000 crowd stood in silence while a band played 'Abide with Me'. Winship was buried in Coventry after a service at St George's Church, Brentford.

Career statistics

References

1901 births
1929 deaths
People from Prudhoe
Footballers from Northumberland
English footballers
Association football fullbacks
Crystal Palace F.C. players
Prudhoe Castle F.C. players
Coventry City F.C. players
Kidderminster Harriers F.C. players
Brentford F.C. players
English Football League players
Date of birth missing